Events from the year 1406 in France

Incumbents
 Monarch – Charles VI

Births
 4 December – Margaret, Countess of Vertus, Duchess of Brittany (died 1466)
 Unknown – Richard Olivier de Longueil, cardinal (died 1470)

Deaths

References

1400s in France